The civil flag of the Opole Voivodeship, Poland is a rectangle divided into two horizontal stripes, with yellow on the top, and blue at the bottom. The top stripe is twice the size of the bottom one.

Design 
The civil flag of the Opole Voivodeship is a rectangle, with an aspect ratio of height to width of 5:8, which is divided into two horizontal stripes, with yellow on the top, and blue at the bottom. The top stripe is twice the size of the bottom one.

The state flag of the voivodeship uses the design of the civil flag, with the coat of arms of the voivodeship placed in the right corner, within the yellow stripe. The coat of arms depicts a yellow (golden) eagle on the blue background within the Old French style escutcheon.

History 

The Province of Upper Silesia, which was partially located within modern borders of the Silesian Voivodeship, adopted its flag in 1920. It was rectangle divided horizontally into two stripes: yellow on top, and dark blue on the bottom. The aspect ratio of its height to its width was equal 2:3. Its colours had been based on the coat of arms of Upper Silesia. It was used until 1935, when Nazi Germany forbid its provinces from flying its flags, ordering them to replace them with the national flag.

The Opole Voivodeship was established in 1999. Its flag was approved by Opole Regional Assembly on 28 September 2004, and officially adopted on 21 December of the same year. It was designed by Michał Marciniak-Kożuchowski.

References 

Opole Voivodeship
Opole Voivodeship
Opole Voivodeship
Opole Voivodeship
2004 establishments in Poland